"Second Hand News" is a song written by Lindsey Buckingham. The song was first performed by the British-American rock band Fleetwood Mac as the opening track of their 1977 album Rumours.

Background
"Second Hand News" was a frontrunner for the lead track off of the album Rumours. According to author Jacob Hoye, its opening lines "I know there's nothing to say/Someone has taken my place" set the mood for the entire album. "Second Hand News" is one of several songs on Rumours that reflects the romantic breakup of Buckingham and bandmate Stevie Nicks. The song was inspired by the redemption Buckingham was finding in other women after the failed relationship with Nicks. He sings that although he does not trust his lover and cannot live with her, he cannot live without her either. Fleetwood Mac biographer Donald Brackett highlights the irony of lines such as "One thing I think you should know/I ain't gonna miss you when you go."

According to Buckingham, the song incorporates Scottish and Irish folk song influences. Buckingham originally introduced the song to the band on the guitar without any lyrics, with the working title of "Strummer." "Strummer" has appeared on various reissues of "Rumours", including the 3-disc edition released in 2013. Buckingham initially withheld the lyrics to avoid getting into an argument with Nicks over them.

The band originally played the song in a march rhythm. However, Buckingham wanted a disco-like groove for the song after hearing the Bee Gees' "Jive Talkin'". Buckingham and co-producer Richard Dashut built up the song with four audio tracks of electric guitar and the use of chair percussion to evoke Celtic rock. A Naugahyde chair was struck to create the unusual percussion sound. Originally, John McVie contributed a bass part that Ken Caillat described as "melodic" and "flowing". However, while McVie was on vacation, Buckingham put down his own bassline, one that was very simple, just quarter notes. “It worked, though. Buckingham had a grand plan in his head, and he got his way. This was the start of him really calling the shots. It became a ‘my way or the highway’ thing with him, which he perfected on the Tusk album.” McVie would eventually rerecord the bass guitar part in accordance with Buckingham's instructions, but he made slight changes to make the part his own.

During the guitar solo, the band overlaid a wordless vocal to enhance the effect. Music journalist Chuck Eddy uses this as a prime example of rock musicians using vocals as a bassline. According to author Cath Carroll, Buckingham's "syncopated scat singing" on this part and his singing on the "vigorous chorus" provides energy to the song. Carroll also praises Mick Fleetwood's drumming on the chorus as being some of his best. Carroll sums up the song by stating that "the romping acoustic guitars, pounding piano, and vigorous vocals combine in the final mix as an exuberant and hyper-rhythmic whole."

Critical reception
Pitchfork critic Jessica Hopper describes "Second Hand News" as "perhaps the most euphoric ode to rebound chicks ever written." She describes it as being similar to the hit single "Go Your Own Way" in being "upbeat but totally fuck you." Rolling Stone magazine critic John Swenson claimed that "Second Hand News" was almost as good as "Go Your Own Way." He says that despite being about the breakup of his relationship with Nicks, the song is "anything but morose, and completely outdoes the Eagles in the kiss-off genre." Musically, Swenson claims that "the chunking acoustic guitar rhythm carries the song to a joyful chorus," resulting in "timeless pop harmony." Hoye considers "Second Hand News" to be an example of one of the lesser-known songs on Rumours that is "just as great as the hits." Author Tracie Ratiner describes "Second Hand News" as one of Fleetwood Mac's "trademark songs." BBC critic Daryl Easlea calls the refrain "euphoric."  Classic Rock History critic Millie Zeiler rated it Buckingham's 4th best song with Fleetwood Mac.

Other appearances
"Second Hand News" was included on the Fleetwood Mac compilation albums 25 Years – The Chain in 1992 and The Very Best of Fleetwood Mac in 2002. The track has also appeared in a couple of live set lists, the most recent being on their 2013 tour.

Personnel

Lindsey Buckingham – electric guitars, acoustic guitar, chair percussion, tom toms, lead vocals
Mick Fleetwood – drums, shakers, marching snare drum
John McVie – bass guitar
Christine McVie – organ, backing vocals
Stevie Nicks – backing vocals

Certifications

Cover versions

Mates of State covered "Second Hand News" on their 2010 album Crushes (The Covers Mixtape). Mates of State member Jason Hammel suggested that this was "the weirdest" challenge they faced on the album. The Mates of State version begins with a reggae beat, which Hammel thought people might hate, but felt that "if people need to be stoned to enjoy this one, so be it." 

Tonic covered the song on the 1998 tribute album Legacy: A Tribute to Fleetwood Mac's Rumours. 

Julienne Taylor covered the song on her 2002 album Racing the Clouds Home and as a single.

Kid Rock sampled "Second Hand News" for the bassline of his 1998 song "Wasting Time."

References

1977 songs
Songs written by Lindsey Buckingham
Fleetwood Mac songs
Song recordings produced by Ken Caillat
Song recordings produced by Richard Dashut
Tonic (band) songs
2000 singles